HMS Jason was a  of the British Royal Navy. She was built by the Naval Construction & Engineering Co. from 1891–1893. She was converted to a minesweeper in 1908–1909 and continued these duties during the First World War. Jason was sunk by a German mine on 7 April 1917.

Design and construction
The Alarms were slightly modified  versions of the previous Sharpshooter-class, with modified engines to improve reliability.

Two triple-expansion steam engines, fed by four locomotive boilers, drove two propeller shafts.

The ship was armed with two 4.7 inch (120 mm) QF guns mounted fore and aft on the ships centreline, backed up by four 3-pounder (47 mm) guns (two in single mounts on the ship's beam and two in casemates forward) and a single .45-inch Gardner machine gun. Three 18-inch (450 mm) torpedo tubes were fitted, with one fixed in the ship's bow and the other two on swivelling mounts on the beam. The ship had a crew of 91.

Jason was laid down at the Naval Construction & Engineering Co.'s (later Vickers Armstrong) Barrow-in-Furness shipyard on 7 September 1891, was launched on 14 May 1892 and completed in June 1893 at a cost of  £49,253.

Service
In August 1894 Jason took part in that year's Naval Manoeuvres, but, owing to problems with her engines, was sent into Milford Haven for repair. In July 1896 she again took part in the Manoeuvres, On 26 June 1897 Jason was present at the Jubilee Fleet Review at Spithead.  Jason took part in the 1900 Naval Manoeuvres in July that year.

Jason returned to Sheerness following her re-engining refit on 14 July 1903.

Jason was in reserve at Chatham in 1906, but joined the Home Fleet in 1907. In June 1909, after refit, Jason rejoined the Nore Destroyer Flotilla.

Jason was  converted to a minesweeper in 1909, She had her boilers re-tubed at Sheerness Dockyard at the end of 1911, and rejoined the Nore division of the Home Fleet at the end of the refit in April 1912.

On the outbreak of the First World War Jason joined the newly established Grand Fleet. In August 1914, the minesweepers attached to the Grand Fleet, including Jason were employed on carrying out daily sweeps of the Pentland Firth.

On 3 April 1917 Jason struck a mine off Coll in the Inner Hebrides, Western Scotland, which had been laid by the German submarine [[SM U-78|U-78]] on 12 February. Jason'' sank, killing 30 of her crew.

Wreck
The wreck of HMS Jason was located in April 2022.

Pennant numbers

References

Bibliography

 

 

Alarm-class torpedo gunboats
Ships built in Barrow-in-Furness
1892 ships